This article refers to the composer; for the politician see John Garth.
John Garth (1721 – 1810) was an English composer, born in Harperley, near Witton-le-Wear, County Durham.

Life

On 23 June 1742 Garth became a freemason at the lodge meeting at the Bird and Bush in Saddler Street, Durham.

Little else is known of his early life, but in September 1745 and August 1746 he promoted concerts in Stockton. In the latter year he was living in Durham city, where he organised a concert series until 1772, selling tickets from his house, first in Sadler Street, thereafter in North Bailey, where he lived until after 1791. It appears that the Durham concerts were in alternate weeks to those organized by his friend Charles Avison in Newcastle, where Garth played the cello. Garth's fame spread and he taught music to leading families in the region, as well as giving organ recitals.

In Darlington, in 1794, he married Nancy (Nanny) Wrightson (1749/50–1829) and died at his home, Cockerton Hall on 29 March 1810. Garth was buried on 5 April 1810 in the north aisle of St Cuthbert's, Darlington.

Works

Garth is chiefly remembered for his eight-volume edition with English text of The First Fifty Psalms Set to Music by Benedetto Marcello (1757–65). He also composed a set of cello concertos (op. 1, 1760) and five sets of harpsichord sonatas (opp. 2, 4–7, 1768–82), among other works. Gerald Finzi took an interest in his music, among other neglected British composers of the 18th and 19th centuries whose work he sought to have published in modern editions.

Discography
John Garth, Six Cello Concertos, The Avison Ensemble, 2 discs, Divine Art
John Garth, Accompanied Keyboard Sonatas Op. 2 and 4, The Avison Ensemble, 2 discs, Divine Art

References 

Classical-period composers
English classical composers
1721 births
1810 deaths
Musicians from County Durham
English male classical composers
19th-century British male musicians
Freemasons of the Premier Grand Lodge of England
People from Witton-le-Wear